Chururu (local name for a kind of flamingo (Phoenicoparrus jamesi, also applied for Phoenicoparrus andinus) also spelled Chururo) is a  mountain in the  Andes of Peru. It is located in the Lima Region, Huaura Province, Santa Leonor District. It lies at the Yanama River southwest of Chururuyuq and west of Muruqucha.

References

Mountains of Peru
Mountains of Lima Region